Clarence Leroy Kea (born February 2, 1959) is an American former professional basketball player. He was a 6'6" (1.98 m) 218 lb (99 kg) power forward.

High school
Born in Wilmington, North Carolina, Kea attended New Hanover High School, in Wilmington, North Carolina, where he played high school basketball.

College career
Kea played college basketball at Lamar University, with the  Lamar Cardinals, from 1976 to 1980.

Professional career
Kea was selected with the 9th pick, of the eighth round, in the 1980 NBA draft, by the Dallas Mavericks. After signing two 10-day contracts with the Mavericks, in 1981, he was signed for the remainder of the 1980–81 season, during which he played in 16 games, averaging 7.3 points and 4.2 rebounds per game. The next season (1981–82), he played in 35 games but his averages dipped to 2.3 points and 1.7 rebounds per game.

After his NBA career, Kea played professionally in Italy (Banco di Roma), Israel (Hapoel Holon), and France (Limoges).

References

External links
NBA stats @ basketballreference.com
Photo of Clarence Kea

1959 births
Living people
African-American basketball players
American expatriate basketball people in France
American expatriate basketball people in Israel
American expatriate basketball people in Italy
American men's basketball players
Basketball players from North Carolina
CB Murcia players
Club Ourense Baloncesto players
Dallas Mavericks draft picks
Dallas Mavericks players
Detroit Spirits players
Hapoel Holon players
Israeli Basketball Premier League players
Lamar Cardinals basketball players
Lehigh Valley Jets players
Liga ACB players
Limoges CSP players
Pallacanestro Virtus Roma players
Power forwards (basketball)
Small forwards
Sportspeople from Wilmington, North Carolina
American expatriate basketball people in the Philippines
Crispa Redmanizers players
Philippine Basketball Association imports
21st-century African-American people
20th-century African-American sportspeople